Chelsea Corputty (born 4 May 1995) is an Indonesian rower. She won the bronze medal in the women's coxless four event at the 2018 Asian Games held in Jakarta and Palembang, Indonesia.

She has also won medals at the Asian Rowing Championships and the Southeast Asian Games.

She won the gold medal in the women's solo coastal rowing competition at the 2016 Asian Beach Games held in Danang, Vietnam.

References

Living people
1995 births
Place of birth missing (living people)
Indonesian female rowers
Rowers at the 2014 Asian Games
Rowers at the 2018 Asian Games
Asian Games bronze medalists for Indonesia
Asian Games medalists in rowing
Medalists at the 2018 Asian Games
Southeast Asian Games medalists in rowing
Southeast Asian Games silver medalists for Indonesia
Competitors at the 2015 Southeast Asian Games
Competitors at the 2021 Southeast Asian Games
21st-century Indonesian women